This is a partial list of Royal West of England Academicians also known as RWA Academicians. The academicians of the Royal West of England Academy (RWA), the oldest public art gallery in Bristol and the UK’s only regional Royal Academy of Art.

Academicians have post-nominals: RWA, PRWA, PPRWA, VPRWA or HonRWA (depending on their membership type). A full list is available on the web pages of the RWA's website.

Note. Associate RWA membership has been discontinued and successful candidates are elected directly to full RWA Academician status.

See Also

References

External 
 
 

RWA Academicians
RWA Academicians